There are currently estimated to be 1,500 Russians in Afghanistan, which in this article refers not only to ethnic Russians, but also to any citizens of Russia.

In the 1960s and 1970s, due to cooperation between the Soviet Union and Afghanistan, there were roughly 10,000 Russian expatriate engineers, interpreters, construction workers, and other similar professionals living in the country, a figure which had grown to 15,000 by the eve of the Soviet–Afghan War in 1979. However, they mostly left the country during or after the war. 

There was also some Russian-language media, but it closed down during the period of Taliban government in the late 1990s.

Some Russians remained. A peculiar example of one is Noor Mohammad, previously named Sergei Yurevich Krasnoperov, who lives in Afghanistan and considers himself a proud Afghan. He fought in the Soviet–Afghan War, before converting to Islam and deserting to the Mujahideen. After the war, he decided not to return to Russia. He now has a wife and 6 children in Afghanistan.

In Balkh Province, near the border with Uzbekistan, there are also reported to be numerous Russian businessmen, who have established ventures in the food, transport, and tourism industries. There are also Russian Jews with dual Russian and Israeli passports, who have been reported to be occasionally harassed by the local security forces following discovery of Israeli citizenship. Afghanistan does not recognise Israeli passports, although bribery is not uncommon.

It was not immediately clear how the Taliban’s return to power in 2021 would affect the Russian community. On 19 October, 'Minnews' reported that the "Russian diaspora in Afghanistan have been little affected by the changes".

See also
 Demographics of Afghanistan
 Armenians in Afghanistan
 History of Arabs in Afghanistan
 Pakistanis in Afghanistan

References

Afghanistan
Ethnic groups in Afghanistan
Immigration to Afghanistan